Pseudidonauton is a genus of moths of the family Limacodidae.

Species
Pseudidonauton admirabile Hering, 1931
Pseudidonauton bhaga Swinhoe, 1901
Pseudidonauton chihpyh Solovyev, 2009
Pseudidonauton nigribasis Hampson, 1905
Pseudidonauton puera Wu, Solovyev & Han, 2021
Pseudidonauton siamica Solovyev, 2009
Pseudidonauton sinensis Wu, Solovyev & Han, 2021
Pseudidonauton vexa Solovyev, 2009

References

 , 2009, Notes on South-East Asian Limacodidae (Lepidoptera, Zygaenoidea) with one new genus and eleven new species. Tijdschrift voor Entomology 152 (1): 167-183.
Two new species of the genus Pseudidonauton Hering, 1931 from China (Lepidoptera, Limacodidae)

Limacodidae genera
Limacodidae
Taxa named by Erich Martin Hering